WGPG-LP (92.9 FM) is a low power radio station broadcasting a religious radio format as an affiliate of LifeTalk Radio. Licensed June 23, 2016, to operate in Battle Creek, in the U.S. state of Michigan, it first began broadcasting in 2016 with transmitter located on the campus of Battle Creek Academy.

History
WGPG is Battle Creeks first radio station specializing in a unique blend of locally sourced Christian music, gospel, and other music. Other local content includes live broadcast and recordings of local church services (Battle Creek Tabernacle and Urbandale SDA Church and other appropriate community events.  The radio station also provides Burmese language programming geared to the growing Burmese immigrant population.  Local programming is supplemented with network programming provided by LifeTalk Radio.

Education
WGPG-LP is also utilized by the Battle Creek Academy as a teaching radio station, allowing Academy students the opportunity to learn, program, and become engaged in local radio.

Sources 
Michigandb.com - BATTLE CREEK COMMUNITY RADIO
FccInfo.com - WGPG FCC Data

External links
 

Contemporary Christian radio stations in the United States
GPG-LP
Radio stations established in 2016
2016 establishments in Michigan
GPG-LP